Gabriel Ascárate (born 20 October 1987) is an Argentine rugby union footballer who played as a centre for Glasgow Warriors in the Pro12.

Career

Ascárate started his career in his homeland playing for both Club Natación y Gimnasia in his hometown of San Miguel de Tucumán and later the Buenos Aires Cricket & Rugby Club.   He also represented the Pampas XV in the South African Vodacom Cup between 2010 and 2012 before moving abroad to join French side US Carcassonne for the 2012–13 season.   He made 18 appearances in France before moving north in July 2013 to join Glasgow Warriors.
 He was released by Glasgow Warriors in February 2014 after being ruled out from 'contact rugby' for 6 months.

International career

He made his senior debut for Los Pumas against Chile in May 2007 and to date he has amassed 8 caps and scored 2 tries.   He is also a former Pumas Sevens player, making 5 appearances in the IRB Sevens World Series between 2008 and 2011.

References

1987 births
Living people
Rugby union centres
Pampas XV players
Glasgow Warriors players
Sportspeople from San Miguel de Tucumán
Argentine rugby union players
Argentina international rugby union players
Male rugby sevens players
Argentine expatriate rugby union players
Expatriate rugby union players in Scotland
Argentine expatriate sportspeople in Scotland
Expatriate rugby union players in France
Argentine expatriate sportspeople in France
Pan American Games medalists in rugby sevens
Pan American Games silver medalists for Argentina
Rugby sevens players at the 2011 Pan American Games
Medalists at the 2011 Pan American Games
Jaguares (Super Rugby) players
Yacare XV players